Jonathan Scott Cohn (born 1969) is an American author and journalist who writes mainly on United States public policy and political issues. Formerly the executive editor of The American Prospect and a senior editor at The New Republic, Cohn is now a senior national correspondent at The Huffington Post.

Career
Before joining The New Republic in 1997, Cohn served as executive editor at The American Prospect. Cohn has also written for the Boston Globe, Mother Jones, The New York Times, Newsweek, Rolling Stone, Slate and the Washington Post. He has been a media fellow at the Henry J. Kaiser Family Foundation. and a senior fellow at Demos, and is a member of the National Academy of Social Insurance. He has appeared on television and radio shows, including MSNBC's "Countdown," NPR's "Fresh Air," and "The Colbert Report".

Cohn's writings have especially focused on social welfare and health care. He has been recognized in the pages of the Washington Post as "one of the nation's leading experts on health care policy" and in The New York Times as "one of the best health care writers out there".

Cohn is the author of the 2007 book, Sick: The Untold Story of America's Health Care Crisis - and the People Who Pay the Price (2007). In Sick, Cohn advocates for universal health insurance, financed by the government. It presents case studies that demonstrate how America's current system causes even many middle class Americans serious financial or medical hardship. It lays out a history of health insurance in America and points to the record of systems abroad, particularly in France.

From early 2009 through the spring of 2010, Cohn edited and was the primary writer for "The Treatment", a blog about health care for The New Republic. In May, 2010, he started a blog for "The New Republic" called "Citizen Cohn", a name he has kept for his Twitter feed.

In 2013, fellow health policy wonk Harold Pollack interviewed  Cohn, getting his take on the future of the Affordable Care Act, the ACA's proposed Medicaid expansion, and the 2012 elections. In 2021, Cohn will publish a book about the Affordable Care Act, The Ten Year War: Obamacare and the Unfinished Crusade for Universal Coverage.

Awards

Winner, AHCJ Excellence in Health Journalism (2013) for "The Robot Will See You Now"

Co-winner, Sidney Hillman Award (2010) for "The Treatment"

Special Mention, Sidney Hillman Award (2009) for "Auto Destruct"

Co-winner, Harry Chapin Media Award (2008) for Sick

Finalist, Robert F. Kennedy Book Award and New York Public Library Helen Bernstein Award (2008) for Sick

Personal life

Cohn was raised in Fort Lauderdale, Florida where he attended Pine Crest School. He went on to study at Harvard University (graduated 1991) where he became President of The Harvard Crimson. He lived for many years in the Boston area before moving to his present home, Ann Arbor, Michigan with his wife, University of Michigan professor Amy Mainville Cohn. She is a professor and researcher in Industrial and Operations Engineering at the University of Michigan.

Cohn was a member of JournoList.

Bibliography

References

External links
About Jonathan Cohn - Sickthebook.com
Video (and audio) conversation with Cohn and Ezra Klein on Bloggingheads.tv
Jonathan Cohn on The Colbert Report

1969 births
Living people
American political writers
American male non-fiction writers
Writers from Ann Arbor, Michigan
Writers from Fort Lauderdale, Florida
American magazine journalists
Journalists from Michigan
The New Republic people
The Harvard Crimson people
Pine Crest School alumni